Mary Beth Imes is an American politician from Kentucky. She represents District 5 in the Kentucky House of Representatives as a member of the Republican Party. Prior to holding office, she was the director of the Imes funeral home.

References 

Living people
1948 births
Republican Party members of the Kentucky House of Representatives
21st-century American politicians